John Robert Radclive (19th century - February 1911, also known as Ratcliffe) was Canada's first professional hangman, serving from 1892 until the early 20th century.

Placed on the federal payroll as a hangman by a Dominion order-in-council in 1892, on the recommendation of the justice minister Sir John Thompson: Radclive had trained under British hangman William Marwood. He is known to have hanged at least 69 people in Canada, although his life total was probably much higher. At his death, the Toronto Telegram said he had 150 executions. He died of alcohol-related illness in Toronto on February 26, 1911, at the age of 55.

Radclive was described as a humane and genial Englishman who regarded himself as a public benefactor.

He was considered to be a competent executioner and was known for the speed of his executions.

He is considered to be one of Canada's best known executioners.

Early life
Radclive spent his early life in the Royal Navy, where he hanged pirates in the South China Sea. He later apprenticed under the English executioner William Marwood, who had invented the table of height and weight that was used to determine the length of rope for a hanging. In 1890, Radclive immigrated to Toronto with his family where he passed along testimonials of his work to local sheriffs. When not serving as a hangman, Radclive worked as a steward under the alias Thomas Rately at the Sunnyside Boating Club, a rowing club in Parkdale, Toronto. However, his identity was accidentally disclosed by an inspector from the North-West Mounted Police.

Hangman
Following an interview with Radclive, Hector Willoughby Charlesworth recorded in his notebook, the Candid chronicles, why Radclive became a hangman:
I once had occasion to interview Radclive on a matter unconnected with his profession and found him a very genial Englishman, who regarded himself as a public benefactor. He said: "If there 'as to be 'angin's the only merciful thing is to do 'edm right!" Asked where he learned his trade he said, "I used to be a sailor on the China seas, and we common seamen was often detailed to 'ang Chinese pirates from the yard-arm. I was sorry for the poor blighters, they used to struggle and suffer so, so I figured out 'ow to do it quick and mercifullike. When I took the Birchall job I was 'ard- up. He seemed a pleasant sort of man, and I figured that it was kinder for me to do the job than to 'ave it bungled by one of them farm 'ands up there, like lots of cases that used to 'appen.  All the time he was talking he was busy packing tools and ropes; and apologized for the discourtesy, by saying that he had to catch a train to go and hang an Indian in the West. He explained his technique.

Hangings

Cordelia Viau and Sam Parslow
Cordelia Viau and her paramour, Sam Parslow, were to be executed on March 9, 1899.

St. Scholastique hanging
The preparations for the hanging on an elderly man at St. Scholastique, Quebec in 1899 had gone well, when the man, while standing on the trap, already hooded, noosed, and pinioned, suddenly fell lifelessly  into Radclive's arms. The presiding physician quickly determined that the man was indeed dead. A quandary thus presented itself in that the man that was to be killed had died prior to being hanged and there was no legal precedent. Although Radclive believed that justice had thus been served, the presiding local sheriff, who was the legal authority at the execution, thought otherwise. The sheriff, referring to the language of the death warrant issued under the imprimatur of His Majesty the King, which unequivocally stated "I do now direct you the said sheriff of the said county to cause execution of the said sentence to be done," argued that the man was to be hanged until dead, and the fact that the subject had expired prior to being hanged was an unanticipated contingency. Thus, the sheriff instructed that Radclive "get a chair", and subsequently the corpse was hung, with the neck snapping audibly. Radclive was deeply distraught by this display of justice that pursued the sentence of death beyond the grave and was offended by this burlesque of his profession.

Following the St. Scholastique hanging, Radclive drank heavily, consuming a bottle of brandy after every execution.

Port Arthur, Ontario - Oliver Prevost

Radclive arrived in Port Arthur, Ontario for the execution of Oliver Prevost, a convicted murderer, on March 15, 1899. This was the first hanging to take place at the Lakehead (now Thunder Bay, Ontario. A testament to Radclive's skill, Prevost was dropped through the trap door and his neck cleanly broken. When the autopsy was undertaken, it was determined that there had been no suffering on the part of the condemned and he had died instantly. So quickly had he expired, in fact, that he did not have time to drop the bible he had been holding and it was still clutched in his hands after death.

Hilda Blake
Emily Hilda Blake was the last official Canadian execution of the 19th century, executed by Radclive on December 27, 1899 at Brandon, Manitoba.

The hanging was described by Frank W. Anderson, a criminologist, in his publication A Concise History of Capital Punishment in Canada.

Later life
Radclive also subsequently suffered from perpetration-induced traumatic stress describing his psychological torment

Despite serving as a hangman, he reversed his repudiated his stance on capital punishment stating:

Hangings
 March 10, 1899 at Montreal – Cordeliau Viau and her paramour Sam Parslow

Further reading

References

Source

 
 
 
 
 
 
 
 
 
 
 
 
 
 
 
 
 
 
 
 

Canadian executioners
1911 deaths